I Wanna Dance with You is the eleventh studio album by American country music artist Eddie Rabbitt, released by RCA Records in 1988. The album produced four singles including the title track, a cover of Dion DiMucci's 1961 hit "The Wanderer", "We Must Be Doin' Somethin' Right" and "That's Why I Fell in Love with You". The first two singles both topped the country charts.

Track listing

Chart performance

Album

Singles

References
[ I Wanna Dance With You], Allmusic.

1988 albums
Eddie Rabbitt albums
RCA Records albums
Albums produced by Richard Landis